Valentin Fyodorovich Turchin (14 February 1931 in Podolsk – 7 April 2010 in Oakland, New Jersey) was a Soviet and American physicist, cybernetician, and computer scientist. He developed the Refal programming language, the theory of metasystem transitions and the notion of supercompilation. He was as a pioneer in artificial intelligence and a proponent of the global brain hypothesis.

Biography
Turchin was born in 1931 in Podolsk, Soviet Union. In 1952, he graduated from Moscow University in Theoretical Physics, and got his Ph.D. in 1957. After working on neutron and solid-state physics at the Institute for Physics of Energy in Obninsk, in 1964 he accepted a position at the Keldysh Institute of Applied Mathematics in Moscow. There he worked in statistical regularization methods and authored REFAL, one of the first AI languages and the AI language of choice in the Soviet Union.

In the 1960s, Turchin became politically active. In Fall 1968, he wrote the pamphlet The Inertia of Fear, which was
quite widely circulated in samizdat, the writing began to be circulated under the title The Inertia of Fear: Socialism and Totalitarianism in Moscow from 1976. Following its publication in the underground press, he lost his research laboratory. In 1970 he authored "The Phenomenon of Science", a grand cybernetic meta-theory of universal evolution, which broadened and deepened the earlier book. By 1973, Turchin had founded the Moscow chapter of Amnesty International with Andrey Tverdokhlebov and was working closely with the well-known physicist and Soviet dissident Andrei Sakharov. In 1974 he lost his position at the Institute, and was persecuted by the KGB. Facing almost certain imprisonment, he and his family were forced to emigrate from the Soviet Union in 1977.

He went to New York, where he joined the faculty of the City University of New York in 1979. In 1990, together with Cliff Joslyn and Francis Heylighen, he founded the Principia Cybernetica Project, a worldwide organization devoted to the collaborative development of an evolutionary-cybernetic philosophy. In 1998, he co-founded the software start-up SuperCompilers, LLC. He retired from his post of Professor of Computer Science at City College in 1999. A resident of Oakland, New Jersey, he died there on 7 April 2010.

He has two sons named Peter Turchin and Dimitri Turchin. Peter Turchin is a specialist in population dynamics and mathematical modeling of historical dynamics.

Work
The philosophical core of Turchin's scientific work is the concept of the metasystem transition, which denotes the evolutionary process through which higher levels of control emerge in system structure and function.

Turchin uses this concept to provide a global theory of evolution and a coherent social systems theory, to develop a complete cybernetics philosophical and ethical system, and to build a constructivist foundation for mathematics.

Using the REFAL language he has implemented a Supercompiler, a unified method for program transformation and optimization based on a metasystem transition.

Major publications

 
 
 
 
 
 
 

 

 

Refal-5: Programming Guide and Reference Manual, New England Publishing Co. Holyoke MA, 1989
Principia Cybernetica Web (as editor, together with F. Heylighen and C. Joslyn) (1993–2005)

Most cited publications according to Google Scholar

References

External links
Valentin Turchin, eulogy by Edward Kline, President of The Andrei Sakharov Foundation
Turchin's home page on Principia Cybernetica web
Profile of Valentin Turchin by Ben Goertzel
Russian edition. The Phenomenon of Science The Phenomenon of Science. A cybernetic approach to human evolution. ETS Publishing House. Moscow - 2000, 398 pp, 
refal.ru - REFAL and Supercompilation community

1931 births
2010 deaths
Cyberneticists
Soviet human rights activists
Superorganisms
Systems scientists
Complex systems scientists
People from Oakland, New Jersey
People from Podolsk
Soviet dissidents
Soviet emigrants to the United States
City University of New York faculty
Amnesty International people
Moscow State University alumni
Soviet mathematicians
Soviet physicists
Programming language designers